Swiftcurrent Mountain is located in the Lewis Range, Glacier National Park in the U.S. state of Montana. Swiftcurrent Mountain is situated along the Continental Divide. The historic Swiftcurrent Fire Lookout is at the top of the mountain.

Geology

Like other mountains in Glacier National Park, the peak is composed of sedimentary rock laid down during the Precambrian to Jurassic periods.

Climate
Based on the Köppen climate classification, the peak is located in an alpine subarctic climate zone with long, cold, snowy winters, and cool to warm summers. Temperatures can drop below −10 °F with wind chill factors below −30 °F.

Gallery

See also
 Mountains and mountain ranges of Glacier National Park (U.S.)

References

Mountains of Flathead County, Montana
Mountains of Glacier County, Montana
Swiftcurrent
Lewis Range
Mountains of Montana